The 2006-2007 ABA season was the sixth season of the American Basketball Association that lasted from November 2007 and ended with the championship game in March 2008 between the Vermont Frost Heaves and the Texas Tycoons. The season ended with the Frost Heaves winning their first ABA championship, 143-95 over the Texas Tycoons.

Many teams did not complete their schedule due to travel problems, costs, etc. and or bad weather. Instead of postponing these games, the squads were forced to forfeit, pushing a few teams, like the defending champion Rochester Razorsharks, to leave the ABA by the end of the season.

Regular Season Standings

Playoff Results

Wild card round
Vermont Frost Heaves (1) received bye to Bracket One Quarterfinal
Jacksonville Jam (2) received bye to Bracket Two Quarterfinal
Texas Tycoons (3) received bye to Bracket Two Quarterfinal
Rochester Razorsharks (4) received bye to Bracket One Quarterfinal
Arkansas Aeros (5) received bye to Bracket One Quarterfinal
Minnesota Ripknees (6) received bye to Bracket Two Quarterfinal
Beijing Aoshen Olympian (7) received bye to Bracket Two Quarterfinal
Bellingham Slam (8) received bye to Bracket One Quarterfinal
Quad City Riverhawks (9) defeated Sauk Valley Rollers (17) 100-86
Wilmington Sea Dawgs (10) defeated Orlando Aces (22) 119-103
Mississippi Miracles (11) defeated Waco Wranglers (23) 131-119
Buffalo Silverbacks (12) received bye to Bracket Two Quarterfinal
Strong Island Sound (13) defeated Quebec City Kebekwa (16) 108-97
Detroit Panthers (14) defeated Peoria Kings (18) 134-125
San Diego Wildcats (15) defeated Gallup Outlaws (20) 133-106
Hollywood Fame (19) defeated Maywood Buzz (21) 143-124

References

American Basketball Association (2000–present) seasons
ABA